A polar aprotic solvent is a solvent that doesn't lack an acidic proton and is polar.  Such solvents lack hydroxyl and amine groups. In contrast to protic solvents, these solvents do not serve as proton donors in hydrogen bonding, although they can be proton acceptors. Many solvents, including chlorocarbons and hydrocarbons, are classifiable as aprotic, but polar aprotic solvents are of particular interest for their ability to dissolve salts. Methods for purification of common solvents are available.

References 

Solvents